Morgan Inlet is an ice-filled inlet about  long, with two branches, indenting the east end of Thurston Island, Antarctica, between Lofgren Peninsula and Tierney Peninsula. The south side of the larger north arm of the inlet is an area of icy rock exposures called the King Cliffs. The east extremity of the wedge-shaped promontory between Lofgren Peninsula and Tierney Peninsula is called Ryan Point.

These features were discovered in helicopter flights from the U.S. Navy Bellingshausen Sea Expedition in February 1960, and were named by the Advisory Committee on Antarctic Names. The inlet was named for Lieutenant Commander Joseph R. Morgan, U.S. Navy, a hydrographic and oceanographic officer of U.S. Navy Task Force 43 during this expedition. The cliffs were named for geologist Charles E. King, a member of the Ellsworth Land Survey which worked at the cliffs in the 1968–69 season. The point is named after A.E. Ryan, Chief Photographer's Mate in the Eastern Group of U.S. Navy Operation Highjump, which obtained aerial photographs of Thurston Island and adjacent coastal areas, 1946–47.

Maps 
 Thurston Island – Jones Mountains. 1:500000 Antarctica Sketch Map. US Geological Survey, 1967.
 Antarctic Digital Database (ADD). Scale 1:250000 topographic map of Antarctica. Scientific Committee on Antarctic Research (SCAR), 1993–2016.

Further reading 
 T.R. Riley, M.J. Flowerdew, R.J. Pankhurst, P.T. Leat, I.L. Millar, C.M. Fanning, & M.J. Whitehouse, A revised geochronology of Thurston Island, West Antarctica and correlations along the proto Pacific margin of Gondwana
 International Symposium on Antarctic Earth Sciences 5th : 1987, Geological Evolution of Antarctica, Cambridge, England, P 400

References 

Inlets of Ellsworth Land
Thurston Island